This article details the canoeing at the 2016 Summer Olympics qualifying phase. Similar to 2012 format, a qualification system has been set up for both slalom and sprint canoeing at these games. The quotas have already been set for each event by the International Canoe Federation in August 2014.

Summary

Slalom

For the slalom events, the men competed in C-1, C-2, and K-1. Women competed in K-1 only. Qualifications were allocated to NOCs, not to specific competitors. NOCs were limited to one boat per event. Qualification spots were earned as follows:
 World Championships: The top placed boats (considering only one boat per NOC) earned their NOCs a qualification. 15 qualification spots were available in the K-1 events, 10 in the C-1, and 8 boats (16 athletes) in the C-2.
 Continental Qualification Events: Only NOCs that did not earn qualification in a given event through the World Championships were eligible. For the K-1 and C-1 events, 1 qualification spot was available for each continent. For the C-2 event, only 3 total qualification spots were available; these were assigned to continents based on World Championship results: the best ranked non-qualifying NOCs from three different continents at the World Championships earned their continent one boat qualification place.
 Host country: Brazil, as the host country, was guaranteed one entry in each event if not already qualified.
 Tripartite Commission: Canoeing (both slalom and sprint) had a total of 2 qualification spots that would be awarded through Tripartite Commission invitations.
 Reallocation: Unused quota spots were reallocated. In practice, this was used where one of an NOC's C-2 competitors also competed in the C-1 event, freeing up the athlete quota spot that NOC had earned in the C-1.

Timeline

Qualification table

Italic: National federation has qualified a boat but the athlete that did this was already counted in another boat
* No continental qualifying race held as less than three nations are eligible.
** National federation is limited to two athlete quota places at a continental qualifying event.

Sprint

NOCs are limited to one boat per event, and in kayaking to 8 men and 6 women positions. Qualification enables an NOC to participate, not necessarily in the person of the paddler who gained the place. Quotas given are for boats. Qualification spots were earned as follows:
 World Championships: The top placed boats (considering only one boat per NOC) earned their NOCs a qualification. 8 boat qualification spots were available in the K-1 events (1 of which was reserved for the host country in the men's 1000 metre and women's 500 metre events), 6 in the K-2 events, 10 in the K-4 events, 7 in the C-1 events (1 of which was reserved for the host country in the 1000 metre event), and 6 in the C-2 event.
 Continental Qualification Events: Only NOCs that did not earn qualification in a given event through the World Championships were eligible. For the K-1, C-1, and C-2 events, 1 boat qualification spot was available for each continent (except that Europe received 2 spots). For the K-2 events, Europe was guaranteed a boat qualification spot but only 3 total qualification spots were available for the remaining 4 continents; these were assigned to continents based on World Championship results: the best ranked non-qualifying NOCs from three different continents at the World Championships earned their continent one boat qualification place.
 Host country: Brazil, as the host country, was guaranteed entries in certain events as listed in the World Championship section.
 Tripartite Commission: Canoeing (both slalom and sprint) had a total of 2 qualification spots that would be awarded through Tripartite Commission invitations.
 Reallocation: Unused quota spots were reallocated. In practice, this was used where some of an NOC's competitors in a larger boat category also competed in a smaller category, freeing up the athlete quota spot that NOC had earned in the smaller category.

Timeline

Qualification table

References

Qualification
Qualification for the 2016 Summer Olympics
Olympics qualification
Olympics qualification